Helder Baiona de Jesus is a Portuguese Olympic middle-distance runner. He represented his country in the men's 1500 meters at the 1976 Summer Olympics. His time was a 3:44.20 in the first heat, and a 3:47.37 in the semifinals.

References

1954 births
Living people
Portuguese male middle-distance runners
Olympic athletes of Portugal
Athletes (track and field) at the 1976 Summer Olympics
Athletes from Lisbon